List of notable people from Southern Kaduna.

Journalists and media personalities

 Rachel Bakam
 Dyepkazah Shibayan
 Pamela Ephraim

Monarchs
 
 

 HRH Ere Yohanna Akaito (JP), Ere-Koro I
 HRH Agwam (Dr.) Gwamna Awan, Agwam Agworok V
 HRH Agwam Nuhu Achi Bature, Agwam Bajju I
 HRH Agwam (Dr.) Ufuwai Bonet, Agwam Agworok VI
 HRH Agwam (Engr. Dr.) Harrison Yusuf Bungwon, Agwatyap II
 HRH Agwam Bala Ade Dauke, Agwatyap I
 HRH Agwom Maiwada Raphael Galadima, Agwom Adara II
 HRH Agwam (Dr.) Josiah Tagwai Kantiyok, Agwam Fantswam II, Agwam Zikpak
 HRH Agwom Yohanna Sidi Kukah, Agwom Akulu II
 HRH Kpop (Dr.) Jonathan Danladi Gyet Maude, Kpop Ham
 HRH Agwam Tagwai Sambo, Agwam Asholyio
 HRH Kpop (Col.) Paul Zakka Wyom (rtd.), Kpop Gwong II
 HRH Agwam (Sir) Dominic Gambo Yahaya, Agwatyap III

Military service
 
 

 Martin Luther Agwai
 Ishaya Bakut
 Musa Bityong
 Zamani Lekwot
 Blessing Liman
 Joshua Madaki
 Yohanna Madaki
 Usman Mu'azu
 Ishaya Aboi Shekari
 Paul Zakka Wyom
 Luka Nyeh Yusuf

Academics, educationists and writers
 
 

 Bala Achi
 Toure Kazah-Toure
 Adamu Kyuka Usman Lilymjok
 Andrew Nkom
 Andrew Jonathan Nok

Economists and bankers
 
 

 Adamu Audu Maikori, banker
 Obadiah Mailafia, economist
 Esther Nenadi Usman, banker

Clergy
 
 

 Joseph Bagobiri
 Chris Delvan Gwamna
 Matthew Hassan Kukah
 Emmanuel Nuhu Kure
 Paul Samuel Zamani

Politicians
 
 

 Isaiah Chawai Balat
 Harrison Yusuf Bungwon
 Bala Ade Dauke
 Sunday Marshall Katung
 Danjuma Laah
 Adamu Audu Maikori
 Obadiah Mailafia
 Esther Nenadi Usman
 Dominic Gambo Yahaya
 Patrick Ibrahim Yakowa
 Senator Caleb Zagi

Legal professionals
 
 

 Sunday Marshall Katung
 Adamu Kyuka Usman Lilymjok
 Adamu Audu Maikori
 Audu Maikori
 Yahaya Maikori

Activists
 
 

 Lois Auta
 Toure Kazah-Toure
 Matthew Hassan Kukah
 Adamu Kyuka Usman Lilymjok

Filmmakers and actors
 
 

 Katung Aduwak
 Ishaya Bako
 DJ Bally
 Toka McBaror
 Binta Sukai

Business entrepreneurs and professionals
 
 

 Isaiah Chawai Balat
 Danjuma Laah
 Audu Maikori
 Yahaya Maikori

Musicians
 
 

 Joe El
 Chris Delvan Gwamna 
 Jordan Bangoji 
 Godwin EY

Science and technology
 
 

 Harrison Bungwon, engineer
 Andrew Jonathan Nok, biochemist
 Josiah Tagwai Kantiyok, consultant
 Andrew Laah Yakubu, engineer

Sports figures
 
 

 Mozes Adams, footballer
 Amos Adamu, sports administrator
 George Bisan, footballer
 Victor Moses footballer

Other
 
 

 Marok Gandu of Magata

References

People from Kaduna State
Southern Kaduna